Wan Chai District is one of the 18 districts of Hong Kong. Of the four on Hong Kong Island, it is north-central, and had 152,608 residents in 2011, a fall from 167,146 residents in 2001. The district has the second-highest educationally qualified residents with the highest-bracket incomes, the second-lowest population and the third-oldest quotient. It is a relatively affluent district, with one in five persons having liquid assets of more than HKD 1 million.

Geography

The zone colloquially known as Wan Chai is loosely that surrounding Tonnochy Road and the Wan Chai station of the MTR, which is between Admiralty on the west and Causeway Bay on the east. Wan Chai North, where major buildings such as the Hong Kong Convention and Exhibition Centre and Central Plaza stand, refers to the zone north of Gloucester Road, reclaimed from the sea after the 1970s.

The broader administrative "Wan Chai District" includes the areas of Wan Chai, Wan Chai North, Causeway Bay, Happy Valley, Jardine's Lookout, Stubbs Road, Wong Nai Chung Gap and Tai Hang.

History

The ceremony of the handover of Hong Kong from the United Kingdom to the People's Republic of China was performed in the then new wing of the Hong Kong Convention and Exhibition Centre in Wan Chai North.

In May 2009, 300 guests and staff members at the Metropark Hotel Wanchai were quarantined, suspected of being infected or in contact with the H1N1 virus during the 2009 swine flu pandemic. A 25-year-old Mexican man who had stayed at the hotel was later found to have the viral infection. He had travelled to Hong Kong from Mexico via Shanghai.

Politics

The district council of Wan Chai has 13 elected members.

Diversity

Today Wan Chai is sometimes described as the heart of the city, representing the epitome of the Hong Kong lifestyle – it has a well-established arts centre, the large exhibition and conference complexes, luxury apartments, five-star and non-five-star hotels, shopping malls, metropolitan office towers and a large government building cluster. It has a multitude of home decoration shops, bars and Mahjong centres. Wan Chai District houses a mosque, as well as cemeteries for several different faiths. Five minutes away from the noisy polluted streets is Bowen Drive, popular for jogging and walking by politicians, movie stars, and government officials.

Entertainment and shopping
The numerous bars and strip joints in the red-light district part of Wan Chai are popular with tourists and visiting US sailors. Within this Fenwick Pier hosted the only McDonald's that served alcohol in Hong Kong until 2004; its replacement is an up-market restaurant.

Johnston Road and Queen's Road East are the two major streets in the area. Export clothing shops line Johnston and Luard Roads predominantly. Queen's Road East has many stores selling Chinese style wooden furniture.

Spring Garden Lane and Tai Wo Street are lined with stalls selling for vegetables, fruit and household items.

Tai Yuen Street specialises in toys in stalls and shops.

Lee Tung Street was in the 2010s converted into a Lee Tung Avenue zone of luxurious residential apartments, shopping, restaurants and bars.

Hotels
Hotels in Wan Chai District include:
The Charterhouse Hotel
Empire Hotel
The Fleming
Grand Hyatt Hong Kong
Hotel Indigo Hong Kong Island
Luk Kwok Hotel
Novotel Century Hong Kong
Renaissance Harbourview
South Pacific Hotel
St. Regis Hong Kong
Wharney Hotel

Education

Notable places
Next to the Hong Kong Convention and Exhibition Centre is the "Golden Bauhinia Square". There is a huge sculpture of a bauhinia, which is the representative flower of Hong Kong, in the square. This is a popular tourist spot in Hong Kong for mainland visitors and also the location of the flag-raising ceremony which occurs daily and in a special form on Chinese National Day and other occasions.

Notable skyscrapers include:
 Central Plaza, the third tallest skyscraper in Hong Kong, located in Wan Chai North
 Hopewell Centre

The Old Wan Chai Post Office is a declared monument. There is also a Police Museum near the junction of Stubbs Road and Peak Road.

The Stubbs Road Lookout is a viewing point of the Victoria Harbour. The famous Lovers' Stone is on scenic Bowen Road.

The House of Trousers is a household belonging to one Mr Trousers who is beacon to all who refuse to leave the "Wan Chai Bubble".

Tai Yuen Street is called 'Toy Street' as this street has a lot of toy shops.

Demographics
According to a household survey by the Census and Statistics Department, the median household income is the second highest of Hong Kong.

Cross-Harbour Transportation
The first tunnel that crosses Victoria Harbour, the Cross-Harbour Tunnel, links the former Kellett Island, now part of Wan Chai, with Hung Hom in Kowloon.

The Star Ferry operates a ferry route from Wan Chai Pier near Hong Kong Convention and Exhibition Centre to Tsim Sha Tsui.

Appearances in popular culture
 The 2000 computer game Deus Ex features Wan Chai Market as the main district in the Hong Kong chapters of the game.
 Almost a third of the 2001 video game Shenmue II is spent in Wan Chai. A small portion of the city is divided into fictional quarters modelled after similar locations.
 The location of the 1957 novel and 1960 film The World of Suzie Wong is set in Wan Chai.
 The 2010 Hong Kong film Crossing Hennessy starring Jacky Cheung and Tang Wei is set in Wan Chai.

See also
 List of places in Hong Kong
 Wan Chai Pier

References

External links
 Wan Chai District Council
 List and map of electoral constituencies (large PDF file)
 Rotary Club of Wanchai
 Introduction of Wan Chai District by Home Affairs Department, HKSAR Government
 Location map in Wan Chai – Hong Kong Convention and Exhibition Centre

 
Districts of Hong Kong
Hong Kong Island